Joseph-Charles Roettiers (13 April 1691 – 14 March 1779) was a noted French engraver and medalist.

Roettiers was born in Paris to Joseph Roettiers (1635–1703). He was a member of the celebrated Roettiers family of engravers, medallists, silversmiths, and goldsmiths; Norbert Roettiers was his cousin, and Charles Norbert Roettiers was his son. In 1715 he obtained the title of Graveur des medailles du Roi and was appointed Engraver General at the Paris Mint in 1727.

1691 births
1779 deaths
18th-century engravers
French medallists
French goldsmiths
18th-century French engravers
French silversmiths
Artists from Paris